Marcell Ligon Ateman (born September 16, 1994) is an American football wide receiver for the St. Louis BattleHawks of the XFL. He played college football at Oklahoma State.

Early years
Ateman attended Wylie East High School in Wylie, Texas. As a senior, he had 84 receptions for 1,584 yards and 27 touchdowns. He committed to Oklahoma State University to play college football.

College career
Ateman played at Oklahoma State from 2013 to 2017. As a true freshman, he played in all 13 games, recording 22 receptions for 276 yards. As a sophomore, he had 20 receptions for 268 yards. As a junior, he had 45 receptions for 766 yards and five touchdowns. Ateman missed the 2016 season due to a foot injury and took a medical redshirt. He returned from the injury and played in all 13 games in 2017, recording 59 receptions for 1,156 yards and eight touchdowns.

Professional career

Oakland / Las Vegas Raiders
Ateman was drafted by the Oakland Raiders in the seventh round (228th overall) of the 2018 NFL Draft. He was waived on September 1, 2018, and was signed to the practice squad the next day. He was promoted to the active roster on October 23, 2018. He made his NFL debut on November 18, 2018, in a Week 11 road game against the Arizona Cardinals, where he had 4 receptions for 50 yards and played a pivotal factor in the Raiders' game-winning drive, as they went on to win 23-21.

On August 31, 2019, Ateman was waived by the Raiders and re-signed to the practice squad. He was promoted to the active roster on October 5, 2019. He was waived on October 8, but re-signed two days later.

On September 5, 2020, Ateman was waived by the Raiders and signed to the practice squad the next day. He was placed on the practice squad/injured list on September 19, and activated back to the practice squad on October 21. He was released on December 10, 2020, and re-signed to the practice squad five days later. On February 3, 2021, Ateman signed a reserve/futures contract with the Raiders.

On August 24, 2021, Ateman was waived by the Raiders. He was re-signed to the practice squad on November 3. He was released on November 18.

Arizona Cardinals
On August 4, 2022, Ateman signed with the Arizona Cardinals. On August 22, 2022, he was released.

St. Louis BattleHawks
With the second pick in the 2023 XFL Skill Players Draft, Ateman was selected by the St. Louis BattleHawks. He was placed on the reserve list by the team on March 8, 2023.

References

External links
Oklahoma State Cowboys bio

1994 births
Living people
Players of American football from Dallas
American football wide receivers
Oklahoma State Cowboys football players
Oakland Raiders players
Las Vegas Raiders players
Arizona Cardinals players
St. Louis BattleHawks players